Chah Gazi (also Romanized as Chāh Gazī and Chāh-e Gazī) is a village in Alamarvdasht Rural District, Alamarvdasht District, Lamerd County, Fars Province, Iran. At the 2006 census, its population was 273, in 58 families.

References 

Populated places in Lamerd County